Lake Guaíba is a waterway (496 km²) in Rio Grande do Sul, the southernmost state of Brazil. It is famous for its beautiful reflection at sunset. The Guaíba is an extension of the Lagoa dos Patos, the largest lagoon in South America. It is commonly referred to as a "river" besides "lake". The Jacuí River, the Sinos River, the Gravataí River and the Caí River empties into the Guaíba from the north.

Both Porto Alegre, the capital and most populous city of Rio Grande do Sul, and Viamão lies on its eastern shore. The cities of Guaíba, Eldorado do Sul and Barra do Ribeiro lies opposite to Porto Alegre, on the western shore.

The Lake Guaíba is navigable, and is connected to the Atlantic Ocean through Lagoa dos Patos and its outlet channel, located farther south, at the city of Rio Grande.

References

Landforms of Rio Grande do Sul
Guaíba